Think! may refer to:

 "Think!", the 30-second music piece played during the Final Jeopardy! Round in the game show Jeopardy!
 "Think!" (short story), a 1977 short story by science fiction writer Isaac Asimov
 Think! (James Brown album), a 1960 song by James Brown and The Famous Flames
 Think! (Lonnie Smith album), 1968
 Think! Road Safety, a road safety campaign airing in the UK media

See also
 Think (disambiguation)